"UR (My Love)" (full title: You Are (My Love)) is the second single of the female Belgian dance singer Kate Ryan and was released on October 15, 2001, in Belgium (peaking at #17 after a few weeks), in 2002 in some other countries too, but with less success.

In the U.S., the single was released in December 2001 with "Désenchantée" as a double-A-single.

Formats and track listings
CD Single
"UR (My Love)" - 3:44
"UR (My Love)" (Peter Luts Radio Edit) - 3:34
12" Single
"UR (My Love)" (Original Extended) - 8:33
"UR (My Love)" (Peter Luts Extended Remix) - 6:57

Official versions
Original Extended - 8:33
Peter Luts Radio Edit - 3:34
Peter Luts Extended Mix - 6:57

Chart positions

Kate Ryan songs
2001 singles
Songs written by Kate Ryan
2001 songs
EMI Records singles